The India men's national basketball team represents India in international men's basketball. It is controlled by Basketball Federation of India.
The team made significant improvements as the sports of basketball is becoming more popular.

A 1936 founding member of FIBA Asia, India has one of Asia's longest basketball traditions. Throughout its history, Team India qualified for the FIBA Asia Championship 26 times and is placed in the top–5 in appearances in this tournament. Further, India's basketball team won four gold medals and one silver medal at the South Asian Games and became the most successful team in South Asian region. India have also won the SABA Championship five times. Team India celebrated its victory at the 2014 Lusofonia Games after they finished the tournament with a 4–0 record as they beat 11–time African Champions Angola in the final.

Its most famous moment came at the 2014 FIBA Asia Cup with the win against home favorites and most successful Asian team China by seven points. This win has been labelled as the "biggest basketball win in the nation's history."

History

India appeared at the international stage for the first time ever at the 1965 Asian Basketball Championship where it started out as moderately competitive.  India became a regular at the event and had their most successful tournament in 1975 when the team even reached the final four.

Plagued by a lack of popularity and support for basketball at home, at times, India faded into oblivion and only had a handful of successful performances. Its most noteworthy tournament appearance was at the 1980 Summer Olympics when the team got its chance to represent Asia due to the cancellations of some teams who took part in the American-led boycott of the 1980 Summer Olympics. A few of the world's top basketball powers at that time (such as the United States and Canada) withdrew from the tournament. India finished 12th out of 12 in the Olympics after getting knocked out in the preliminary round by losing all three of their matches and then losing all five of their matches in the Classification round.

While the results did not go India's way one game in particular caught the attention of basketball fans worldwide. India played against the Australian Team, one of the world's top basketball teams. India, which was made up solely of voluntary basketball players competed against the elite team of Australia for almost the whole game until it finally ceded to the Boomers 75–93 after leading at halftime 41–37.

Many Indian players also made headlines while in the Soviet Union as well. Ajmer Singh gained worldwide attention as he was amongst the top 10 shooters there and became the 10th best pivot player in the tournament there.

The late 90s saw the emergence of Sozhasingarayer Robinson, the first Indian basketball player who gained considerable international attention. Robinson led India to a surprising victory over South Korea, one of Asia's top teams.

In 2005, however, Robinson complained that the structure and support for basketball in India was still mediocre and government officials did not do enough to support the sport. As a protest, he retired from the national team.

At the 2011 FIBA Asia Championship India was coached by former Sacramento Kings head coach Kenny Natt.

In 2012, former NBA D-League and U.S. college coach, Scott Flemming, took over the team. Under his supervision, the team won the South Asia Championship in 2014. India had two wins and finished 3 places higher (11th) in the 2013 FIBA Asia Championship than in 2011. In 2014, the Young Cagers (as team India is often nicknamed) won the Lusofonia games with wins over Guinea-Bissau, Cape Verde, and Angola in the gold medal game. This was Team India's first title ever in a non-Asian competition. In the 2014 FIBA Asia Cup India pulled off the biggest win in their 80-year history by defeating China on their home court 65–58. The establishment of a professional league was a major step in continuing this recent success the Indian team had experienced. In 2011, plans for the establishment thereof were officially agreed upon.

Gallery

Competitive record

Summer Olympics

FIBA Asia Cup

Asian Games

Asia Challenge

SABA Championship

Commonwealth Games

South Asian Games

Lusofonia Games

Current roster

2021 FIBA Asia Cup qualification

Depth chart

Head coach history

Past rosters
1980 Olympic Games: finished 12th among 12 teams

Baldev Singh, Ajmer Singh, Parvez Diniar, Dilip Gurumurthy, Harbhajan Singh, Jorawar Singh, Amarnath Nagarajan, Pramdiph Singh, Paramjit Singh (c), Radhey Shyam, Hanuman Singh, Tarlok Singh Sandhu (Coach: Major Makolath Rajan)

1997 Asian Championship: finished 11th among 15 teams

Pankaj Malik, B.S. Gowtham, Gagnesh Kumar, Ashok Kumar, N. Appla Raju, Parmindar Singh, Nishant Kumar, Virendar Joshi, Jaldeep Dhaliwal, D. Swaminathan, Srikant Reddy (Coach: Major N.K. Singh)

1999 Asian Championship: not qualified

2001 Asian Championship: finished 8th among 14 teams

Vinay Kumaryadan, J.Murli, B.J. Jadeja, Mohit Bhandari, S.Sridhar, Parmindar Singh, Ranjeet Singh, Austin Almeida, Sozhasingarayer Robinson, Suresh Ranot, M.S. Sabeer Ahamed, Des Raj (Coach: Keshav Kumar Chansoria)

2003 Asian Championship: finished 8th among 16 teams

Sambhaji Kadam, Gagnesh Kumar, Mihir Pandey, S. Gopinath, S.Sridhar, Parmindar Singh, Muraleekrishna Ravindran, Trideep Rai, Sozhasingarayer Robinson, Riyaz Uddin, Snehpal Singh, Des Raj

2005 Asian Championship: finished 12th among 16 teams

Sambhaji Kadam, Shiv Kumar, Mihir Pandey, Anoop Mukkanniyil, Yadwinder Singh, Rajanna Sanjay Raj, Muraleekrishna Ravindran, Trideep Rai, Sozhasingarayer Robinson, Riyaz Uddin, Talwinderjit Singh, Jagdeep Singh (Coach: Jay Prakash Singh)

2007 Asian Championship: finished 15th among 16 teams

Sambhaji Kadam, Shiv Kumar, Ravikumar Krishnasamy, Anoop Mukkanniyil, Roshan Thankachan Padavetiyil, Rajanna Sanjay Raj, Muraleekrishna Ravindran, Trideep Rai, Dilawar Singh, Riyaz Uddin, Lokesh Yodav, Jagdeep Singh (Coach: Aleksandar Bucan)

2009 Asian Championship: finished 13th among 16 teams

Sambhaji Kadam, Talwinderjit Singh, Hareesh Koroth, Harpalsinh Vaghela, Sunil Kumar Rathee, Vishesh Bhriguvanshi, Prakash Mishra, Vineeth Revi Mathew, Abhilek Paul, Jayram Jat, Dinesh Comibatore, Jagdeep Singh (Coach: Aleksandar Bucan)

2011 Asian Championship: finished 14th among 16 teams

  
  
  
  
  
  
  
  
  
  
  
  
  
  

2013 Asian Championship: finished 11th among 15 teams

2014 Asian Games: finished 12th among 16 teams

2015 FIBA Asia Championship      "finished 8th Among 16 qualified teams in Asia "

2016 FIBA Asia Challenge "finished 7th Among 12 qualified teams in Asia "

2017 FIBA Asia Cup

{{
2019 FIBA world cup:' qualified among 16 teams
INDIA team players
Amjyot Singh Gill
Satnam Singh
Ashpreet Bhular
Vighnesh more
Tanmay shende
Garry  Rodriguz
}}

2019 FIBA Basketball World Cup qualification

2022 FIBA Asia Cup qualification

Kit

Manufacturer
2015–present: Roox

See also
Basketball Federation of India
Basketball in India
India women's national basketball team
India national under-19 basketball team
India national under-17 basketball team
India national 3x3 team

References

External links
Official website
FIBA profile
India Basketball Records at FIBA Archive
Asia-basket - India Men National Team
Presentation on Facebook

Videos
India v Japan - Group B - Game Highlights - 2015 FIBA Asia Championship Youtube.com video

 
Men's national basketball teams
1936 establishments in India
Basketball